Nicolae Teclu, known for a short time as Policolor is a metro station in southeastern Bucharest on Line M3. It is on the Nicolae Grigorescu – Anghel Saligny M3 branch and was opened on 20 November 2008 as part of the extension from Nicolae Grigorescu to Linia de Centură (now Anghel Saligny). Initially, a shuttle started operating between Nicolae Grigorescu and Linia de centura. The regular operation started on 4 July 2009. It is named after Nicolae Teclu, a Romanian chemist.

References

Bucharest Metro stations
Railway stations opened in 2008
2008 establishments in Romania